M.P.G. is the ninth studio album by American soul musician Marvin Gaye, released in 1969 for the Tamla label. His best-selling album of the 1960s, it became Gaye's first solo album to reach the Top 40 on the Billboard Pop Albums chart, peaking at No. 33, and also became his first No. 1 album on the Soul Albums Chart. Three Top 40 hits were released from the album. The title matches the initials of Gaye's full name, Marvin Pentz Gay.

Production
Norman Whitfield provided the compositions "Too Busy Thinking About My Baby" (originally recorded by labelmates The Temptations), "That's The Way Love Is" (originally recorded by The Isley Brothers) and a cover of Gladys Knight and the Pips' "The End of Our Road". The singles "Too Busy Thinking About My Baby", the longest-running #1 hit on the R&B charts in 1969 and a #4 Pop hit, and "That's The Way Love Is" (#2 and #7 on the soul and pop charts, respectively) became consecutive million-sellers. These records were among Whitfield's many psychedelic soul productions of the time, and recalled the arrangement of Gaye's #1 hit "I Heard It Through the Grapevine".

Release and reception
Released on April 30, 1969, the album became Gaye's first solo album to reach the Top 40 on the Billboard Pop Albums chart, peaking at #33, and also became his first #1 album on the Top Soul Albums chart.

The album was moderately received on release, and remains overlooked, though Ron Wynn in a retrospective review for AllMusic, felt the album contains "some outstanding songs". In a contemporary review (23 August 1969), Jack Egan in Rolling Stone felt that Gaye did not "aim for spectacular effects", but that the album "treats the listener to the same infectious music and subtly varied singing" of Gaye's previous successful singles.

Track listing

Personnel
Marvin Gaye – lead vocals
The Andantes – background vocals
The Funk Brothers – instrumentation

References

1969 albums
Marvin Gaye albums
Tamla Records albums
Albums produced by Norman Whitfield
Albums recorded at Hitsville U.S.A.